Shela may refer to:
 Shela (name), a human personal name closely related to "Shelah"
 "Shela" (song), a 1985 song by the American band Aerosmith 
 Shela, Tibet, a village in the Tibet Autonomous Region of China
 the village of Shela on Lamu Island, Kenya
 Shela (artist), Japanese pop artist
 An old-fashioned Australian slang term for "woman" or "girl"
 Rav Shela, Babylonian Amora

See also
 Shelah (disambiguation) 
 Shelagh (disambiguation)